Neptis nemetes, commonly known as the Nemetes sailer, is a butterfly in the family Nymphalidae. It is found in western, central and eastern Africa. The habitat consists of lowland forests and riverine thicket.

The larvae feed on Asteraceae species, Alchornea cordifolia and Macaranga and Alchornea species.

Subspecies
Neptis nemetes nemetes (Senegal, Guinea-Bissau, Burkina-Faso, Guinea, Sierra Leone, Liberia, Ivory Coast, Ghana, Togo, Nigeria, western Cameroon to Democratic Republic of the Congo, Uganda, southern Sudan, western Kenya, Zambia) 
Neptis nemetes margueriteae Fox, 1968 (southern Cameroon, Gabon, Equatorial Guinea: Mbini, Congo, Democratic Republic of the Congo, Angola, southern Sudan, Uganda, western Kenya, western Tanzania, Zambia)
Neptis nemetes obtusa Rothschild & Jordan, 1903 (Ethiopia)

References

Butterflies described in 1868
nemetes
Butterflies of Africa
Taxa named by William Chapman Hewitson